The following is a list of amphibians of Thailand. There are more than 160 species recorded.

Species list
The following table is a checklist of amphibians of Thailand, with geographic ranges, citations, and Thai names included.

Common species
Amphibian species commonly found in anthropogenically modified environments include:

Family Bufonidae (True toads)
Duttaphrynus melanostictus

Family Microhylidae (Narrow-mouthed frogs)
Kaloula pulchra
Microhyla butleri
Microhyla fissipes (formerly classified as Microhyla ornata)
Microhyla heymonsi
Microhyla pulchra

Family Dicroglossidae (Fork-tongued frogs)
Fejervarya limnocharis
Hoplobatrachus rugulosus
Occidozyga lima
Occidozyga martensii

Family Ranidae (True frogs)
Hylarana erythraea
Hylarana macrodactyla

Family Rhacophoridae (Afro-Asian tree frogs)
Polypedates leucomystax

See also
List of reptiles of Thailand
List of birds of Thailand
List of mammals of Thailand
List of butterflies of Thailand
List of non-marine molluscs of Thailand
List of species native to Thailand

References

Thailand
Thailand
Amphibians